Karl Neilson (born 1971 in Liverpool) is a British television director.

He left school and started work as a van driver for an electrical goods company in Southport. Harbouring an ambition to be a director, he returned to education at the Liverpool Community College. He won a place on the Media Production Bachelor of Arts course at Bournemouth University, and graduated with first class honours in 1996.

Neilson's television career began as an assistant director on EastEnders all the way back in 1998. Alongside EastEnders, he was also the assistant director for Silent Witness. It was then in September 2001 that Neilson appeared officially in the credits as a director, when he directed his first episode of EastEnders. In 2004, a double episode set in the launderette with Dot Cotton telling Den Watts she had cancer won a TV Moments award, named as 'Best Popular Drama Moment' of 2004.

As well as directing for the BBC, he has also directed episodes of The Bill and Family Affairs for TalkbackThames. In 2008 he began directing the new series of Minder for FIVE which was later axed due to poor viewing figures.

In 2015, EastEnders celebrated its thirtieth anniversary with a Live Week. Neilson directed the live week episodes along with the flashback episode. Commenting upon directing the dramatic culmination of the week, Neilson said: "As a director it's an absolute gift of a week, because it's a story where the audience are continually looking for meaning in every line and every reaction. Because of that I was determined to get very specific performances which would steer the story as I wanted it to be steered throughout the week."

Filmography
The following is a table of notable episodes and television shows directed by Neilson.

References

External links

Karl Neilson at the British Film Institute
Karl Neilson at Hollywood.com
Karl Neilson at The New York Times

British television directors
Alumni of Bournemouth University
Broadcast mass media people from Liverpool
1971 births
Living people